Christopher Téa Opéri (born 29 April 1997) is an Ivorian professional footballer who plays as a defender for French  club Le Havre.

Career
After years in the youth academy of Caen, Opéri was transferred to Châteauroux on 24 July 2017. He made his first professional appearance with Châteauroux in a 2–1 Ligue 2 loss to Gazélec Ajaccio on 22 September 2017.

On 2 June 2021, he signed a two-year contract with Gent in Belgium. On 21 June 2022, Opéri's contract with Gent was terminated by mutual consent.

On 29 June 2022, Opéri returned to France and signed a two-year contract with Le Havre.

References

External links
 
 
 

1997 births
Footballers from Abidjan
Living people
Ivorian footballers
French footballers
French sportspeople of Ivorian descent
Association football defenders
LB Châteauroux players
K.A.A. Gent players
Le Havre AC players
Ligue 2 players
Championnat National 3 players
Belgian Pro League players
Ivorian expatriate footballers
French expatriate footballers
Expatriate footballers in Belgium
French expatriate sportspeople in Belgium